Neobathyclupea melanoptera is a species of fish in the family Bathyclupeidae found off Myanmar

References

| Species New to Science

Bathyclupeidae
Taxa named by Artem Mikhailovich Prokofiev
Taxa named by Ofer Gon
Taxa named by Peter Nick Psomadakis
Fish described in 2016